Pietralata may refer to:

 Pietralata (Rome), the 21st quarter of Rome
 Pietralata (Rome Metro), a station on Line B of the Rome Metro
 Pietralata (film), a 2008 Italian film